The 2018 Asian Women's Volleyball Challenge Cup was supposed to be the inaugural edition of the Asian Women's Volleyball Challenge Cup, a biennial international volleyball tournament organised by the Asian Volleyball Confederation (AVC) with Volleyball Association of Hong Kong, China. But due to unforeseen reasons the tournament did not held.

Qualification

The AVC members associations, some teams were participated for the 2017 Asian Women's Volleyball Championship. The AVC members associations were from five zonal associations, including, Central Asia (2 teams), East Asia (3 team), Oceania (2 team), Southeastern Asia (1 team).

Qualified teams
The following teams qualified for the tournament.

Pools composition
The draw results.

Preliminary round

Pool standing procedure
 Number of matches won
 Match points
 Sets ratio
 Points ratio
 Result of the last match between the tied teams

Match won 3–0 or 3–1: 3 match points for the winner, 0 match points for the loser
Match won 3–2: 2 match points for the winner, 1 match point for the loser

Pool A

Pool B

Final round

Classification round

Fifth semi-finals

Seventh place match

Fifth place match

Championship round

Quarter-finals

Semi-finals

Third place match

Final

Final standing

Medalists

Awards

Most Valuable Player

Best Outside Spikers

Best Setter

Best Opposite Spiker

Best Middle Blocker

Best Libero

See also
2018 Asian Men's Volleyball Challenge Cup
2018 Asian Women's Volleyball Cup

References

External links
 Asian Volleyball Confederation

2018
Asian Challenge Cup
Challenge Cup, Women, 2018
2018 in Hong Kong women's sport
December 2018 sports events in China